Wang Qiang (born 14 January 1992) is a Chinese professional tennis player. She has won two singles titles on the WTA Tour, one WTA 125 singles title, and 13 singles titles and one doubles title on the ITF Circuit. Her best result at a Grand Slam tournament came at the 2019 US Open where she reached the quarterfinals. On 9 September 2019, Wang reached her highest singles ranking of world No. 12, becoming the second-highest ranked Chinese tennis player in history after Li Na. Alongside Li Na, Zheng Jie, Peng Shuai, and Zhang Shuai, Wang is one of only five Chinese tennis players to have reached the quarterfinals of a Grand Slam tournament.

Career

Wang was born in Tianjin. At age nine, she started playing tennis. That year, she became the promotion player for the Tianjin National Tennis Center. For two years consecutively (2006, 2007), she won the Junior's Tennis Championship in China. She officially started touring the ITF Women's Circuit in Japan as of 2007.

In February 2010, she was a main-draw player at the AOAO Sports charity themed 'Fiji Tennis Invitation Classis' [FTIC] created by Ademola Oduwole on Denarau Island in Fiji aimed at promoting girls sports. She defeated Christina Visico of the Philippines in the finals to win her $2,000 purse and a $4,000 Chris Aire watch donated by the Hollywood Luxury watch designer

Wang achieved her first big WTA Tour win at the 2013 Malaysian Open where, after qualifying, she beat top seed and world No. 10, Caroline Wozniacki in the first round.

She made her Grand Slam main-draw debut at the 2014 US Open from the qualifying tournament, and defeated Paula Kania from Poland in the first round by 6–2, 6–0, before losing to Australian Casey Dellaqua in the second round.

In 2016, Wang's best results came at the Grand Slam tournaments, reaching the second round of the Australian Open, French Open, and US Open. She also competed in singles at the 2016 Summer Olympics, but lost in the first round to two-time Grand Slam winner Svetlana Kuznetsova.

In 2017, Wang reached her first quarterfinal at a Premier-level tournament, winning three straight set matches in Dubai (a Premier 5 tournament) before losing to Anastasija Sevastova. She finished the year ranked inside the top 50 for the first time, at No. 45 in the world.

2018: Asian Games gold medalist, two WTA titles, world No. 20
Wang got off to a very slow start in the 2018 season, winning just one main draw match in her first four tournaments. She then reached the fourth round in Indian Wells, defeating former top-10 players Timea Bacsinszky and Kristina Mladenovic en route, before falling to world No. 1, Simona Halep. Wang struggled in her next tournaments, and her ranking dropped to No. 91 in the world.

She then reached her first quarterfinal of the year in Strasbourg, losing to top seed Ashleigh Barty. At the French Open, Wang upset the ninth seed and seven-time Grand Slam winner Venus Williams in the first round, then defeated Petra Martić to advance to the third round of a Grand Slam event for the first time. However, she was then beaten by Yulia Putintseva. The only grass-court tournament she played in was Wimbledon, where she lost in the opening round to Zheng Saisai.

Wang won the golden medal in singles at the Asian Games defeating Jeong Su-nam, Gozal Ainitdinova, Aldila Sutjiadi, Liang En-shuo, and finally compatriot Zhang Shuai in the final.

Wang also had a great run in the Asian Swing. She won her first WTA tour tile in July at Jiangxi, where she defeated Zheng Saisai in the final. After reaching the third round at the US Open before falling to Elina Svitolina, Wang won her second title of the year (and career) in Guangzhou, where she didn't drop more than four games in each match throughout the tournament. As a result of her Guangzhou triumph, she reached a new career-high ranking of world No. 34 and replaced Zhang Shuai as the highest-ranked Chinese player.

The next week, she competed at the Premier-5 tournament in Wuhan, where she defeated Maria Sakkari, eighth seed Karolína Plíšková, and Daria Gavrilova in the first three matches. In the quarterfinals, she defeated 2016 Olympic gold medalist Monica Puig in straight sets to reach the semifinals, but was forced to retire from the match against Anett Kontaveit due to injury. She became the first ever Chinese player to reach the semifinals at the tournament, and reached another new career-high ranking of No. 28.

Wang received a wildcard into the China Open in Beijing. As a Wuhan Open semifinalist, she received a first-round bye. She defeated the 2017 French Open champion Jelena Ostapenko in the second round by 6–0, 6–0. In the third round, she beat Karolína Plíšková for the second time in consecutive weeks in straight sets. In the quarterfinal, she defeated Wuhan champion Aryna Sabalenka in two very tight sets. Her run ended in the semifinal, at the hands of former world No. 1, Caroline Wozniacki. However, her first ever Premier Mandatory semifinal earned her a new career-high ranking of No. 24.

Wang was seeded sixth at the Hong Kong Open. She defeated Zhang Ling and Christina McHale to reach the quarterfinals, where she faced top seed Elina Svitolina. Wang took a decisive lead quickly, taking the first set 6–2 and was leading 5–2 in the second when the match was suspended for the night due to a sudden downpour. She closed out the set 6–4 the next day, advancing to the semifinals; she defeated fourth seed Garbiñe Muguruza in three sets, coming back from a 1–4 deficit in the third to win 7–5. In her third final of the year, Wang was defeated by 18-year-old Dayana Yastremska in straight sets. On 22 October, she reached a new career-high ranking of No. 22.

She was awarded a wildcard to enter the Elite Trophy, but with withdrawals from both Serena Williams and Jelena Ostapenko, she qualified for the main draw with her ranking. In her first round-robin match, she lost to Daria Kasatkina in three sets. She then played Madison Keys, winning the match in three sets. Later, Keys, as the winner of the group, announced her withdrawal due to a knee injury, allowing the second-placed Wang to play the semifinal match against Muguruza, where she won in straight sets. In the final, she was defeated by Ashleigh Barty. Her performance in Zhuhai saw her break the top 20 for the first time, and ensured she would end the year as world No. 20.

2019: First Grand Slam quarterfinal, top 15 debut and career-high ranking

Seeded 21st at the Australian Open (her first ever seeding at a Grand Slam tournament), Wang defeated Fiona Ferro and Aleksandra Krunić, and then lost to 13th seed Anastasija Sevastova. This was her best performance to date at the tournament. At Indian Wells, she defeated 16th seed Elise Mertens and reached the fourth round, losing to the Canadian wildcard (and eventual champion) Bianca Andreescu. In Miami, she reached the quarterfinals, where she lost to second seed Simona Halep. At the Prague Open, she was seeded third, reaching the quarterfinals and then lost to Bernarda Pera. Wang failed to advance past the second round at any tournament during the clay-court season, losing in the first round at Madrid and Rome, and losing in the second round at Strasbourg and the French Open.

At the Birmingham Classic, she defeated Lauren Davis and then lost to Venus Williams in the second round. She subsequently withdrew from the Eastbourne International. At Wimbledon, she was seeded 15th. She defeated Vera Lapko and Tamara Zidanšek, and then lost to Elise Mertens in the third round. This was her best result at the tournament to date.

She achieved a series of new career-high rankings over the course of the year, achieving the world No. 15 ranking prior to Wimbledon.

Seeded 18th at the US Open, Wang defeated Caroline Dolehide, Alison Van Uytvanck, and Fiona Ferro to advance to the second week of a Grand Slam event for the first time. She then upset tournament favorite and world No. 2, Ash Barty, in the fourth round, her first victory over a top-three player, to advance to her first Grand Slam quarterfinal. She became just the fifth Chinese player in history, after Li Na, Zheng Jie, Peng Shuai, and Zhang Shuai, to reach a Grand Slam singles quarterfinal, and the third to do so at the US Open, after Li and Peng. However, she heavily lost to eventual runner-up Serena Williams in straight sets, winning just one game. After the tournament, she rose six places to reach another new career high of world No. 12, becoming the second-highest ranked Chinese singles player in history.

Wang struggled following the US Open though, managing just two match wins on the Asian hard courts, one in Wuhan and the other in Tianjin. After failing to qualify or receive a wildcard for the Elite Trophy, she finished the year ranked No. 29, her second consecutive year inside the top 30.

2020: Australian Open win over Serena Williams
Wang opened her new season with a quarterfinal appearance at the Shenzhen Open and a first-round loss to Angelique Kerber at Adelaide. Seeded 27th at the Australian Open, she defeated Pauline Parmentier and Fiona Ferro to reach the third round, where she pulled off a major upset by defeating eighth seed Serena Williams in three sets, avenging her lopsided loss to the American at the previous US Open. However, she was upset herself in the fourth round by the unseeded Tunisian Ons Jabeur. After the Australian Open, Wang played three more events, losing in the quarterfinals of the Hua Hin Championships, and the first round of both the Dubai Open and Qatar Open.

2021: Rough start, first clay final, return to top 40, hiatus, out of top 100
Wang returned to action on the WTA Tour in the Abu Dhabi Open but lost to Daria Kasatkina in the first round. This was followed by another two opening-match losses in the Gippsland Trophy and the Australian Open. Wang finally won her first match of the season against Maddison Inglis in the Phillip Island Trophy, but lost in the next round to Irina-Camelia Begu. Wang's next event was in Adelaide, where again she was able to get a round of 32 win, this time against Olivia Gadecki, before falling to Jil Teichmann in her fifth three-set loss of the season. Wang failed to get a win in the Middle East swing, losing to Jessica Pegula and Svetlana Kuznetsova, despite serving for the match against the latter. Wang played at Miami, where she managed to win a deciding set for the first time in the season, beating Aliona Bolsova, but fell in two tight sets to Markéta Vondroušová in the next round. Following this event, due to Wang defending a large number of ranking points, Wang fell to the world No. 50, as the China No. 2.

Wang opened her clay-court season with a win over Anastasia Gasanova in the İstanbul Cup, however she suffered three consecutive losses after this; against Ana Konjuh in that same tournament, then Karolína Muchová in Madrid and Amanda Anisimova in Rome. However, Wang rebounded for the next event, the Emilia-Romagna Open, where she beat a top 100 player for the first time that season, defeating Misaki Doi, followed by victories over Martina Di Giuseppe, Petra Martić, and Sloane Stephens to reach her first ever clay final and first final outside of China in three years. However, she ended up losing in a lopsided final, winning only four games against Coco Gauff. This tournament brought Wang back into the top 40 of the WTA rankings, and she regained the spot as the top ranked Chinese tennis player. She left the French Open with a second-round finish, again with a straight-sets loss to Coco Gauff.

At the Tokyo Olympics, she reached the second round defeating Verónica Cepede Royg. Her win over the Paraguayan bettered her Rio 2016 debut where she lost to Svetlana Kuznetsova in the first round.

2022: Australian Open third round
For the first time since the 2020 Australian Open, Wang won consecutive matches in a Grand Slam at the 2022 Australian Open by upsetting 18th seed Coco Gauff in the first round, and then defeating Alison Van Uytvanck. Wang backed up this result with a semifinal appearance in Abierto Zapopan, where she fell in straight sets to Marie Bouzková, then a quarterfinal appearance in the Monterrey Open, where she was also beaten in straight sets, this time by Leylah Fernandez.

At the 2022 Wimbledon Qiang Wang defeated 14th seed Belinda Bencic in three sets in the first round, but lost in the next round to the unseeded Heather Watson. Wang headed into the Prague Open as the 2nd seed in the qualifying draw, getting into the main draw in straight sets. In the main draw Wang was able to get into the semi-finals, before losing to the 7th seed Anastasia Potapova.

Performance timelines

Only main-draw results in WTA Tour, Grand Slam tournaments, Fed Cup/Billie Jean King Cup and Olympic Games are included in win–loss records.

Singles
Current through the 2022 Toray Pan Pacific Open.

Doubles
Current after the 2021 Italian Open.

Significant finals

WTA Elite Trophy

Singles: 1 (runner–up)

WTA career finals

Singles: 5 (2 titles, 3 runner-ups)

Doubles: 1 (runner-up)

WTA Challenger finals

Singles: 2 (1 title, 1 runner-up)

ITF Circuit finals

Singles: 18 (13 titles, 5 runner–ups)

Doubles: 2 (1 title, 1 runner–up)

WTA Tour career earnings
Current after the 2022 Abierto Zapopan

Career Grand Slam statistics

Seedings
The tournaments won by Wang are in boldface, and advanced into finals by Wang are in italics.

Head-to-head record

Record against top 10 players
Wang's record against players who have been ranked in the top 10. Active players are in boldface.

Wins over top 10 players

Notes

References

External links
 
 
 
 
 
 
 

1992 births
Living people
Tennis players from Tianjin
Chinese female tennis players
Asian Games gold medalists for China
Asian Games medalists in tennis
Tennis players at the 2014 Asian Games
Olympic tennis players of China
Tennis players at the 2016 Summer Olympics
Medalists at the 2014 Asian Games
Tennis players at the 2018 Asian Games
Medalists at the 2018 Asian Games
Tennis players at the 2020 Summer Olympics